Ramon Olamilekan Azeez (born 12 December 1992) is a Nigerian footballer who plays as a central midfielder.

He spent the vast majority of his professional career in Spain, starting at Almería B. In La Liga, he appeared for the first team of that club and Granada.

An international since 2014, Azeez represented Nigeria at the 2014 World Cup.

Club career

Almería
Born in Abuja, Azeez began playing football in the Future Pro Academy. In 2010 he agreed a move to UD Almería in Spain, but had to wait until July 2011 to complete the transfer.

On 17 August 2012, after one full season with the reserves in the Segunda División B, Azeez made his debut with the first team: he came on as a substitute for Javier Casquero in the 55th minute of an away fixture against FC Barcelona Atlètic in the Segunda División (5–4 win), but was himself replaced after just ten minutes after being booked and, according to manager Javi Gracia, risking a subsequent sending off.

Azeez was definitely promoted to the Andalusians' main squad on 28 June 2013, with the club having just promoted to La Liga. He made his debut in the competition on 30 August, playing 23 minutes of the 2–2 home draw with Elche CF.

On 21 December 2013, Azeez scored his first professional goal, the game's only in a win at Real Betis. He repeated the feat in the second meeting between the two sides, scoring in the 94th minute for a 3–2 victory at the Estadio de los Juegos Mediterráneos.

Azeez featured sparingly during the 2014–15 campaign, as Almería suffered relegation. In June 2015 he requested a transfer, and after failing to sign a professional contract he was demoted back to the reserves in August.

On 26 January 2016, Azeez returned to the main squad, seriously threatened with relegation, after agreeing to a professional deal.

Lugo and Granada
On 13 July 2017, free agent Azeez signed with CD Lugo also of the Spanish second tier. On 1 February 2019, he joined Granada CF of the same league on a three-and-a-half-year contract.

On 21 September 2019, Azeez headed home from close range following an Antonio Puertas cross, in the first minute of a 2–0 home win over defending champions FC Barcelona. In February 2021, he was loaned to FC Cartagena until the end of the second-division season.

International career
Azeez appeared with the Nigeria under-17's at the 2009 FIFA World Cup, and was a regular in a team that finished runners-up. Two years later, also as a starter, he participated in the U-20 World Cup.

On 3 February 2014, Azeez was called up to the full side for a friendly with Mexico. He made his debut on 5 March, playing the second half of the 0–0 draw at Georgia Dome.

Azeez was named in the provisional 30-man squad ahead of the 2014 FIFA World Cup on 6 May. He was included in Stephen Keshi's final list for the tournament, and made his debut on 16 June by starting in a 0–0 draw against Iran.

In September 2019, Azeez was recalled to the national team after five years.

Career statistics

Club

International

Honours
Nigeria U17
FIFA U-17 World Cup runner-up: 2009

References

External links

1992 births
Living people
People from Abuja
Yoruba sportspeople
Nigerian footballers
Association football midfielders
La Liga players
Segunda División players
Segunda División B players
UD Almería B players
UD Almería players
CD Lugo players
Granada CF footballers
FC Cartagena footballers
Nigeria under-20 international footballers
Nigeria international footballers
2014 FIFA World Cup players
Nigerian expatriate footballers
Expatriate footballers in Spain
Nigerian expatriate sportspeople in Spain